Albert Victor Pearson (6 September 1892 – 24 January 1975) was an English footballer who played as a forward for Sheffield United, Port Vale, Liverpool, Llanelli, Rochdale, Stockport County and Ashton National Gas. His son-in-law, George Heppell, and great-great-grandson, Tom Conlon, also played for Port Vale.

Career
Pearson played for Hebburn Argyle and Sheffield United before joining Port Vale in the summer of 1914. He was a first team regular during the war years and was a member of the side that won the North Staffordshire Infirmary Cup in 1915. The club went into abeyance due to war concerns during the 1915–16 and 1916–17 seasons, but he continued his first team duties at The Old Recreation Ground upon the club's re-forming. He was sold to First Division side Liverpool in January 1919, however Sheffield received some of the fee as they claimed he was still on their books, despite him leaving them five years previous. He missed only nine games in his second season for the "Reds", but fell out of favour at Anfield the next season. He went back to Port Vale in May 1921 and regained his first team place, and played 19 Second Division games before he picked up an injury in February 1922 and was released at the end of the season. He moved on to Llanelli, Rochdale, Stockport County and Ashton National Gas.

Personal life
His son-in-law, George Heppell, played for Port Vale between 1937 and 1952, whilst his great-great-grandson, Tom Conlon, joined the club in 2018.

Career statistics
Source:

Honours
Port Vale
North Staffordshire Infirmary Cup: 1915

References

Sportspeople from Tynemouth
Footballers from Tyne and Wear
English footballers
Association football forwards
Sheffield United F.C. players
Port Vale F.C. players
Liverpool F.C. players
Llanelli Town A.F.C. players
Rochdale A.F.C. players
Stockport County F.C. players
Ashton National F.C. players
English Football League players
1892 births
1975 deaths